The abbreviation MVFS may stand for:
Marikina Valley Fault System, a geological fault geographically located at the Philippines
Rational MultiVersion File System, a virtual file system